Psalm 40 is the 40th psalm of the Book of Psalms, beginning in English in the King James Version: "I waited patiently for the LORD". The Book of Psalms is part of the third section of the Hebrew Bible, and a book of the Christian Old Testament. In the slightly different numbering system used in the Greek Septuagint and Latin Vulgate translations of the Bible, this psalm is Psalm 39. In Latin, it is known by the incipit, "". It is described by the Jerusalem Bible as a "song of praise and prayer for help".
 
Psalm 40 is used in both Jewish and Christian liturgies. It has been set to music, Baroque settings and U2's song "40" from their 1983 album, War. Two composers used the beginning for symphonic compositions, Mendelssohn's Lobgesang and Stravinsky's Symphony of Psalms.

Text

Hebrew Bible version 
The following is the Hebrew text of Psalm 40:

King James Version 
 I waited patiently for the LORD; and he inclined unto me, and heard my cry.
 He brought me up also out of an horrible pit, out of the miry clay, and set my feet upon a rock, and established my goings.
 And he hath put a new song in my mouth, even praise unto our God: many shall see it, and fear, and shall trust in the LORD.
 Blessed is that man that maketh the LORD his trust, and respecteth not the proud, nor such as turn aside to lies.
 Many, O LORD my God, are thy wonderful works which thou hast done, and thy thoughts which are to us-ward: they cannot be reckoned up in order unto thee: if I would declare and speak of them, they are more than can be numbered.
 Sacrifice and offering thou didst not desire; mine ears hast thou opened: burnt offering and sin offering hast thou not required.
 Then said I, Lo, I come: in the volume of the book it is written of me,
 I delight to do thy will, O my God: yea, thy law is within my heart.
 I have preached righteousness in the great congregation: lo, I have not refrained my lips, O LORD, thou knowest.
 I have not hid thy righteousness within my heart; I have declared thy faithfulness and thy salvation: I have not concealed thy lovingkindness and thy truth from the great congregation.
 Withhold not thou thy tender mercies from me, O LORD: let thy lovingkindness and thy truth continually preserve me.
 For innumerable evils have compassed me about: mine iniquities have taken hold upon me, so that I am not able to look up; they are more than the hairs of mine head: therefore my heart faileth me.
 Be pleased, O LORD, to deliver me: O LORD, make haste to help me.
 Let them be ashamed and confounded together that seek after my soul to destroy it; let them be driven backward and put to shame that wish me evil.
 Let them be desolate for a reward of their shame that say unto me, Aha, aha.
 Let all those that seek thee rejoice and be glad in thee: let such as love thy salvation say continually, The LORD be magnified.
 But I am poor and needy; yet the Lord thinketh upon me: thou art my help and my deliverer; make no tarrying, O my God.

Structure 
The first part of the Psalm (verses 1-11) is one in the series of psalms of thanksgiving of an individual. Verses 13-18, possibly set originally in an independent Psalm context, are virtually identical to Psalm 70. This part belongs more in the group of psalms of lament. Matthew Henry divides the psalm into three sections:
Confidence for deliverance (verses 1-5)
Christ's work of redemption (6-10) 
A prayer for mercy and grace (11-17).

Interpretation
Some writers see verses 6-9 as prophetic of Jesus, or of the messiah generally.

John Wesley saw it as a prayer of salvation.

Uses

Judaism
Verse 2 is found in the repetition of the Amidah during Rosh Hashanah.
Verse 12 is the second verse from V'hu Rachum in Pesukei Dezimra, and the long Tachanun recited on Mondays and Thursdays.

New Testament 
Verses 6-8 are quoted in Hebrews .

This phrase "I delight to do your will" is also contrasted with the verse in the same Psalm where "They delight to do me harm". This adds to this imagery portending the plots against and betrayal of Jesus. The following Psalm 41 is also seen by the New Testament to portend the betrayal of Jesus by Judas.

Book of Common Prayer
In the Church of England's Book of Common Prayer, this psalm is appointed to be read on the morning of the eighth day of the month.

Music
Heinrich Schütz wrote a setting of a paraphrase of Psalm 40 in German, "Ich harrete des Herren", SWV 137, for the Becker Psalter, published first in 1628. Mendelssohn used the beginning in German as the text for the fifth movement from his Lobgesang. The same verses in Latin form the text of the second movement of Stravinsky's Symphony of Psalms.

The Psalm was used in U2's song "40", the final track from their 1983 album, War.

A song by The Mountain Goats titled "Psalm 40:2" appears on their 2009 album The Life of the World to Come, inspired by this verse.

References

External links 

  in Hebrew and English - Mechon-mamre
 
 
 Text of Psalm 40 according to the 1928 Psalter
 Psalm 40 – The Servant Comes to Do God’s Will text and detailed commentary, enduringword.com
 For the leader. A psalm of David. / Surely, I wait for the LORD; who bends down to me and hears my cry text and footnotes, usccb.org United States Conference of Catholic Bishops
 Psalm 40:1 introduction and text, biblestudytools.com
 Psalm 40 / Refrain: Great are the wonders you have done, O Lord my God. Church of England
 Psalm 40 at biblegateway.com
 Hymns for Psalm 40 hymnary.org

040
Works attributed to David